American rock band Train has released 11 studio albums, two live albums, one compilation album, one video album, four extended plays, 34 singles, six promotional singles, and 29 music videos. The band independently released their eponymous debut studio album in 1996, two years after their formation. In February 1998, the band signed to Aware Records and Columbia Records and re-released the album under the two labels. Three singles were released from Train; the album's first single, "Meet Virginia", peaked at number 20 on the US Billboard Hot 100. The album peaked at number 76 on the US Billboard 200 and was certified platinum by the Recording Industry Association of America (RIAA). In the period following the release of Train, producer Brendan O'Brien started working with the band in a partnership that would last for three albums. The band released their second studio album Drops of Jupiter in March 2001; it was preceded by the release of its lead single, "Drops of Jupiter (Tell Me)". The single became a commercial success, peaking at number five on the US Billboard Hot 100 and also becoming a top 10 hit in Australia, the Netherlands and the United Kingdom. "Drops of Jupiter (Tell Me)" also won an award for Best Rock Song at the 44th Grammy Awards. The album peaked at number six on the Billboard 200, earning a double platinum certification from the RIAA. "She's on Fire", the third single from Drops of Jupiter, achieved moderate success in Australia and the UK. Train's third studio album, My Private Nation, was released in June 2003. It peaked at number six on the Billboard 200 and was certified platinum by the RIAA. The album's first two singles, "Calling All Angels" and "When I Look to the Sky", peaked at numbers 19 and 74 respectively on the Billboard Hot 100. The band released their fourth studio album For Me, It's You in January 2006. The album peaked at number 10 on the Billboard 200 and spawned three singles.

Following a three-year hiatus, Train released the single "Hey, Soul Sister" in 2009. It became an international hit, peaking at number three on the Billboard Hot 100, topping the charts in Australia and the Netherlands and becoming a top 10 hit in multiple other countries. Save Me, San Francisco, the band's fifth studio album, was released in October 2009. For the album, the band worked with several producers, including Martin Terefe and Gregg Wattenberg. It peaked at number 17 on the Billboard 200, earning a gold certification from the RIAA. The album's second and third singles, "If It's Love" and "Marry Me", became top 40 hits on the Billboard Hot 100. In April 2012, Train released their sixth studio album California 37; it peaked at number four on the Billboard 200. The album's lead single "Drive By" peaked at number 10 on the Billboard Hot 100 and also became a top 10 hit in multiple other countries. Bulletproof Picasso followed in September 2014, peaking at number five on the Billboard 200, and was succeeded by the releases of the Christmas album Christmas in Tahoe in November 2015 and the Led Zeppelin tribute Train Does Led Zeppelin II in June 2016. A Girl, a Bottle, a Boat, the band's 10th studio album, was released in January 2017, peaking at number eight on the Billboard 200.

Albums

Studio albums

Live albums

Compilation albums

Video albums

Extended plays

Singles

Promotional singles

Other charted songs

Other appearances

Music videos

Notes

References

External links
 Official website
 Train at AllMusic
 
 

Discographies of American artists
Pop music group discographies
Rock music group discographies
Discography